Luiz Mattar and Cássio Motta were the defending champions, but both players decided to compete on the singles tournament only.

Ricardo Acuña and Luke Jensen won the title by defeating Javier Frana and Diego Pérez 6–1, 6–4 in the final.

Seeds

Draw

Draw

References

External links
 Official results archive (ATP)
 Official results archive (ITF)

Doubles